Wild West Days (1937) is a Universal film serial based on a Western novel by W. R. Burnett.  Directed by Ford Beebe and Clifford Smith and starring Johnny Mack Brown, George Shelley, Lynn Gilbert, Frank Yaconelli, Bob Kortman, Russell Simpson, and Walter Miller, it was the 103rd of the studio's 137 serials (and the 35th with sound), and was the first of three serials Brown made for the studio before being promoted to his own B-western series in 1939.

Premise
Larry and Lucy Munro own a hidden gold mine.  Newspaper editor Matt Keeler wants the mine for himself and has Larry framed for to get it. Frontiersman Kentucky Wade - with Dude Hanford, Mike Morales and Trigger Benton - come to the Munros' aid.

Cast
 Johnny Mack Brown as Kentucky Wade (as John Mack Brown)
 George Shelley as Dude Hanford
 Lynn Gilbert as Lucy Munro
 Frank Yaconelli as Mike Morales
 Bob Kortman as Trigger Benton (as Robert Kortman)
 Russell Simpson as Matt Keeler 
 Walter Miller as Doc Hardy
 Charles Stevens as Buckskin Frank 
 Frank McGlynn Jr. as Larry Munro (as Frank McGlynn)
 Francis McDonald as Assayer Purvis 
 Al Bridge as Steve Claggett
 Chief Thunderbird as Chief Red Hatchet 
 Robert McClung as Mouth Organ Kid [Chs. 8-11]
 Edward LeSaint as Sheriff (as Ed LeSaint)
 Joseph W. Girard as Judge Lawrence
 Jack Rube Clifford as Corey (as Jack Clifford)
 William Royle as Braden
 Bruce Mitchell as Rancher Tobe Driscoll
 Miki Morita as Chan, 2nd Cook [Chs. 7, 9, 11-12]

Production
This serial was based on the novel "Saint Johnson" by William R. Burnett.  However, the main character in the serial is a frontiersman called Kentucky Wade instead of Wayt Johnson as in the novel.

Chapter titles
 Death Rides the Range boobs
 The Redskins' Revenge
 The Brink of Doom
 The Indians Are Coming
 The Leap for Life
 Death Stalks the Plains
 Six Gun Law
 The Gold Stampede
 Walls of Fire
 The Circle of Doom
 The Thundering Herd
 Rustlers and Redskins
 The Rustlers' Roundup
Source:

See also
 List of film serials
 List of film serials by studio

References

External links

1937 films
American black-and-white films
1930s English-language films
Films based on American novels
Films based on Western (genre) novels
Films based on works by W. R. Burnett
Films directed by Ford Beebe
Universal Pictures film serials
1937 Western (genre) films
American Western (genre) films
1930s American films